This is a list of songs by the band Noisettes, and what albums and singles they were released on.

 
Noisettes